Mariam Traore (born 1980) is an Ivorian team handball player. She plays on the Ivorian national team, and participated at the 2011 World Women's Handball Championship in Brazil.

References

1980 births
Living people
Ivorian female handball players